Sarasavi Bookshop (Pvt) Ltd is bookstore chain in Sri Lanka. Currently Sarasavi Bookshop is the largest bookstore chain in Sri Lanka with 23 branches covering major cities in the island.

Retail companies of Sri Lanka